White Ruthenians may refer to:

 inhabitants of the historical region of White Ruthenia in general
 historical and exonymic term for Belarusians

See also
 Ruthenia (disambiguation)
 Ruthenian (disambiguation)